The following is a list of indoor arenas in Switzerland with a capacity of at least 1,000 spectators, most of the arenas in this list are for multi use proposes and are used for popular sports such as individual sports like karate, judo, boxing as well as team sports like Ice Hockey, Curling, volleyball. Parts of the arenas also host many concerts and world tours.

Currently in use

Under construction

Under proposition

See also 
List of football stadiums in Switzerland
List of indoor arenas by capacity

References 

 
Switzerland
Indoor arenas